Dragan Radenović (Sarajevo, FNRY, April 12, 1951) is a Serbian artist, university professor, and academician.

Biography

Origin 
He was born in the family of Radivoje Radenović, a Yugoslav People's Army officer, and his mother Ranđija, born Maksimović. Two daughters and a son were born in Radenović's marriage.

Education 
Dragan Radenović is a law graduate. 

He also graduated from the Sculpture Department of the Faculty of Applied Arts in Belgrade in 1982. He has a master's degree in art and a doctorate in philosophy.

Achievements 
Radenović has provided the most contributions in the field of art, art pedagogy, and art theory. His sculptures are in important world museums and private collections. He is the author of sculptures for two important annual awards in Hollywood, California: the Mary Pickford Award and Nikola Tesla Award. 

He has exhibited in dozens of solo exhibitions and several hundred collective exhibitions in the country and abroad. He is the winner of the award for artistic achievements and contribution to the development of art theory. The studio and sculpture park of the sculptor Radenović is located on Ciganski brdo above Grocka, near Belgrade.

As a professor of art academies, he teaches basic sculpture discipline – modeling and the theory of the language of visual communication. He is a member of many international artistic and scientific organizations and a participant in important projects. He has been a member of the Association of Fine Artists of Serbia since 1980 and a member and founder of YUSTAT. He is a member of the Associated American Artists, the Sculpture Guild, and the International Association of Fine Artists at the United Nations.

He was the Secretary of the Department of Logistics and Systems at the Center for Multidisciplinary Studies of the University of Belgrade in 1979.

He is a member of the Russian Academy of Arts, which was founded in 1757 by Empress Catherine the Great as the Imperial Academy of Arts. Currently, this academy is the oldest institution of this character in the world.

Theoretical works (selection)

Monographs 
 Petrović, Radmilo; Radenović, Dragan (2008): Kulturno nasleđe islama. Beograd: Atelje Vizantija.
 Petrović, Radmilo; Radenović, Dragan (2010): Dizajn i savremena umetnost. Beograd: Metaphysica.

Essays 
 Radenović, Dragan; (2018): Modernizam i postmodernizam. In: Lukić, Aleksandar (ur.): Filozofija etosa : spomenica Simu Elakoviću. Beograd: Srpsko filozofsko društvo, pp. 218–221.
 Radenović, Dragan (2018): Fašizam, granica — zapad : rasprava o savremenom fašizmu. In: Filozofija i sloboda. Beograd : Srpsko filozofsko društvo, pp. 211–219.

Exhibition catalogs (selection) 
 Radenović, Dragan (2008): Radenović : skulpture : Moderna galerija, Lazarevac, jun 2008. Lazarevac: Centar za kulturu.
 Radenović, Dragan (2009): Dragan Radenović : evo čoveka : izložba, Kragujevac, 2009. Beograd: Grafolik.
 Radenović, Dragan (2007): Dragan Radenović : raspeća : = crocifissioni. Beograd: R. Petrović; Ministarstvo kulture Srbije.
 Radenović, Dragan (2010): Vystavka „Ce, čelovek - Ecce homo : Imperatorskaya akademiya hudožestv, Moskva”, 2010. Beograd: Grafolik.
 Radenović, Dragan (2012): Radenović : Skulptura / sculpture : Čovek u savremenom svetu / Man in a contemporary world : Ozone, 30. april – 6. maj 2012. Beograd: Ozone.
 Radenović, Dragan; Mileusnić, Dragan; Živković, Miodrag (2014): Živković, Mileusnić, Radenović : tri : Nacionalna galerija, Beograd, 17. jun-17. jul 2014. god. Uredio Gorča Stamenković. Beograd: D. Radenović.

References

External links 
 Opušteno - prof. dr Dragan Radenović - 13.11.2021.
 НЕСКРИВЕНО ГОСТ: ДРАГАН РАДЕНОВИЋ 13 12 2021

1951 births
Serbian artists
Serbian sculptors
Living people